The Boeing KC-46 Pegasus is an American military aerial refueling and strategic military transport aircraft developed by Boeing from its 767 jet airliner. In February 2011, the tanker was selected by the United States Air Force (USAF) as the winner in the KC-X tanker competition to replace older Boeing KC-135 Stratotankers. The first aircraft was delivered to the Air Force in January 2019. The Air Force intends to procure 179 Pegasus aircraft by 2027.

Development

Background

In 2001, the U.S. Air Force began a procurement program to replace around 100 of its oldest KC-135E Stratotankers, and selected Boeing's KC-767. The Boeing tanker received the KC-767A designation from the United States Department of Defense in 2002 and appeared in the 2004 edition of DoD model designation report. The USAF decided to lease 100 KC-767 tankers from Boeing.

U.S. Senator John McCain and others criticized the draft leasing agreement as being wasteful and problematic. In response to protests, the USAF struck a compromise in November 2003, whereby it would purchase 80 KC-767s and lease 20 more. In December 2003, the Pentagon announced a freeze on the program over an investigation into alleged corruption that led to the jailing of one of its former procurement executives who applied to work for Boeing. The KC-767A contract was officially canceled by the DoD in January 2006.

USAF KC-X program

In 2006, the USAF released a request for proposal (RFP) for a new tanker program, KC-X, to be selected by 2007. Boeing announced it may enter a higher capability tanker based on the Boeing 777, named the KC-777 Strategic Tanker.  Airbus partnered with Northrop Grumman to offer the Airbus A330 MRTT, the tanker version of the A330, which was marketed to the USAF under the designation KC-30. In January 2007, the USAF issued the KC-X Aerial Refueling Aircraft RFP, calling for 179 tankers (four system development and demonstration and 175 production), in a contract worth an estimated US$40 billion. However, Northrop and EADS expressed dissatisfaction at how the RFP was structured and threatened to withdraw, leaving only Boeing in the running.

On 12 February 2007, Boeing announced it was offering the KC-767 Advanced Tanker for the KC-X, stating that the KC-767 was a better fit than the KC-777 for the requirements. On 11 April 2007, Boeing submitted its KC-767 tanker proposal to USAF. The KC-767 offered for this KC-X round was based on the in-development 767-200LRF (Long Range Freighter), rather than the -200ER on which Italian and Japanese KC-767 aircraft are based, differing by combining the -200ER fuselage, -300F wing, gear, cargo door and floor, -400ER digital flightdeck and flaps, uprated engines, and "sixth-generation" fly-by-wire fuel delivery boom.

Boeing submitted its final proposal on 3 January 2008. On 29 February 2008, the DoD chose the KC-30 over the KC-767, the USAF subsequently designated it KC-45A. Boeing submitted a protest to the United States Government Accountability Office on 11 March 2008 and waged a public relations campaign in support of their protest. On 18 June, after USAF admissions on bidding process flaws, the GAO upheld Boeing's protest and recommended the contract be rebid. On 9 July 2008, Defense Secretary Robert Gates announced that the USAF would reopen bidding, and put the contract into an "expedited recompetition" with Defense Undersecretary John Young in charge of the selection process, not the USAF. A draft of the revised RFP was provided to contractors on 6 August 2008 for comments. However, on 10 September 2008, the DoD canceled the KC-X solicitation.

On 24 September 2009, the USAF began the first steps in the new round of bids, with a clearer set of criteria, including reducing the number of requirements from 800 to 373 in an attempt to simplify the process and allow a more objective decision to be made. On 4 March 2010, Boeing announced it would bid the KC-767 tanker for the new KC-X round. EADS announced in April 2010 it would submit a tanker bid without Northrop Grumman as a U.S. partner. Boeing submitted its KC-767 "NewGen Tanker" bid on 9 July 2010. The company submitted a revised bid on 10 February 2011.

In addition to the KC-X, observers speculate that a modified KC-46 will be used as the basis of the KC-Y tanker program, the second step of the USAF's three-step tanker renewal plan, as replacing it with something entirely new is likely too big a risk. In September 2016, Air Mobility Command stated that the follow-on KC-Y acquisition program to replace the remaining KC-135s had been abandoned in favor of further KC-46s with upgrades.

Selection and early development
On 24 February 2011, the USAF announced the selection of Boeing's KC-767 tanker bid. The aircraft was designated KC-46A. Boeing was also awarded a development contract, which called for the delivery of 18 initial operational KC-46s by 2017. The USAF sought a total of 179 new tankers. Boeing's "NewGen Tanker" is based on the 767-200 with an improved version of the KC-10 refueling boom, and cockpit displays from the 787.

In June 2011, development costs were reportedly projected to overrun by about $300 million. Boeing would be responsible for this amount, which exceeds the contract cost cap of $4.9 billion. In July 2011, revised cost projections indicated a reduced cost overrun. In March 2015, the program cost for development and procurement of 179 tankers was projected to total US$43.16 billion. In 2013, the USAF added additional crews and flight hours to their future plans in response to a review that showed that the best of current plans did not take full advantage of the KC-46's cargo and aeromedical evacuation advantages over the KC-135.

On 21 August 2013, Boeing and the USAF completed a critical design review (CDR) for the KC-46. With the CDR complete, the design was set and production and testing could proceed. Wing assembly for the first aircraft began on 26 June 2013. Flight testing of the 767-2C airframe, which would be reconfigured into the KC-46, was scheduled to begin in mid-2014. The first fully-equipped KC-46 was projected to fly in early 2015. The contract called for Boeing to build four test aircraft and deliver 18 combat-ready tankers by August 2017. The USAF intended to buy 179 KC-46s, with all delivered by 2028.

On 12 December 2013, Boeing joined the wings and fuselage for the first 767-2C to be adapted into a KC-46A. The first of four 767-2C provision freighters were to complete assembly by the end of January 2014. Once assembled, it would go through ground vibration and instrumentation testing and have body fuel tanks added. The first test flight would occur during summer 2014 and include measuring its rate of climb and descent. The Engineering Manufacturing and Design (EMD) model was to be integrated with the needed systems and technologies to become a military-standard KC-46A by January 2015. Seven low-rate production KC-46s were to be delivered in 2015, 12 in 2016, and 15 delivered annually from 2017 to 2027. The last of four test aircraft began assembly on 16 January 2014.

In April 2014, the Government Accountability Office (GAO) found that the KC-46 program was projected to underrun its projected cost estimate of $51.7 billion by $300 million. The program acquisition unit cost per jet will also be $287 million, $1.8 million less than estimated. The GAO noted that delays in training air crew and maintainers could cause testing to slip 6–12 months, but also stated that the program had not missed any major milestones and that the development of about 15.8 million lines of software code was progressing as planned. In May 2014, the USAF estimated the development program's cost, including the first four aircraft, could rise from $4.4–4.9 billion to $5.85 billion.

In July 2014, Boeing recorded a $272 million pre-tax charge to cover the tanker's wiring redesign. The wiring issue arose when it was found that 5-10% of the wiring bundles did not have sufficient separation distance or were not properly shielded to meet a USAF requirement for double or triple-redundant wiring for some mission systems. In September 2014, it was confirmed that the wiring redesign would delay the first 767-2C flight from June 2014 to November 2014.

Flight tests and delays

The 767-2C's first flight took place on 28 December 2014; it flew from Paine Field and landed at Boeing Field. In March 2015, a refueling test with a C-17 transport was stopped because of a higher-than-expected boom axial load while delivering fuel; the problem was caused by the turbulent "bow wave effect" generated by two large aircraft flying in line. On 24 January 2016, the KC-46 successfully refueled an F-16 for the first time during a 5 hour 36 minute sortie. Test refueling of several other military aircraft followed, including a C-17, F/A-18, A-10, and AV-8B. On 10 February, a KC-46 refueled an F/A-18, using its probe-and-drogue system for the first time.

In July 2015, Boeing announced a further $835 million pretax charge for the faulty integrated fuel system's redesign and retrofit. Wiring and fuel system flaws could delay contracts worth $3 billion for up to eight months; following schedule revisions agreed by the USAF and Boeing, the first flight of a fully equipped KC-46 was delayed to as late as September 2015. The Bank of America/Merrill Lynch noted in July 2015 "We fail to understand how Boeing could take a $1.26 billion pre-tax charge (since it won the contract over Airbus) on the Boeing KC-46A program since the program is based on the 767 airframe that has been in production for over 30 years." On 22 March 2016, the Defense Contract Management Agency reportedly had low confidence in the August 2017 deadline, predicting the first 18 tankers' delivery to run about seven months late based on past performance and current risks, such as production delays, a new joint USAF-Boeing schedule review, and flight test uncertainties. The Pentagon's test office was to start combat testing in April 2017.

An April 2016 GAO report projected an additional four months beyond the August 2017 target to deliver 18 KC-46s, and that operational testing will not begin until May 2017 and will not be completed until two months after delivery of the first 18 aircraft, risking late discoveries of problems. The GAO also noted that Boeing has not obtained Federal Aviation Administration's approval for two key aerial refueling systems—the centerline drogue system and the wing aerial refueling pods, which were built without following FAA processes—Boeing projected readiness for FAA certification by July 2017, over three years late. The 18 KC-46s were to include the four EMD aircraft raised to operational standards, plus the first 14 low-rate production tankers. Instead, 16 of the 18 were off the production line; Boeing was also liable for all late design fixes on tankers delivered before testing ended.

On 25 April 2016, the fourth test aircraft, 767-2C EMD-3, first flew. EMD-3 focused on environmental control systems, including temperature and smoke penetration testing. Two days later, Boeing took another pre-tax charge of $243 million for cost overruns, bringing the total amount paid for tanker cost overruns to $1.5 billion. Boeing president and chief executive Dennis Muilenburg stated that 80% of the test points required for a positive Milestone C decision had been completed. Flight testing helped determine whether a refueling fault could be resolved by either software or hardware changes, which Boeing worked on in parallel.

On 26 May 2016, a further delay of at least six months due to technical and supply chain issues was reported, potentially requiring program re-structuring and cuts. At the time, only 20% of the flight tests were completed. On 2 June 2016, USAF spokesman Maj. Rob Leese confirmed that, while the contract with Boeing lacked predefined delay penalties, not delivering the 18 certified KC-46s by August 2017 is a contract schedule breach, and that the USAF would receive considerations from Boeing in the schedule re-baseline after the RRA delay. On 12 July 2016, US Defense Acquisitions Chief Frank Kendall confirmed that the tanker program office was studying the delay's cost to the USAF, and that it was entitled to consideration for losses from operating the KC-135 for longer than planned.

On 8 June 2016, Boeing's defense unit CEO, Leanne Caret, reported that a modified boom would be flown shortly. On 10 July 2016, Caret reported positive results from early flight tests with the revised boom. On 21 July 2016, Boeing took a further $393 million charge on the program, bringing the total value of penalties to almost $1.9 billion. The charge reflected higher costs associated with the schedule and technical challenges, such as the boom axial load issue, delays in the certification process and concurrency between testing and initial production. The initial 18 KC-46s were equipped with the boom and centerline drogue, but not the wing-mounted wing-aerial refueling pods (WARP) needed for full contractual Required Assets Available, they were delivered separately later.

On 5 July 2016, USAF spokesman Daryl Mayer stated that, despite the testing delays, Milestone C approval was expected in the following month, and that Boeing would add a fifth EMD aircraft to accelerate testing. EMD-1 and EMD-3 primarily conducted flight tests towards FAA airworthiness certificates, while EMD-2 and EMD-4 focused on USAF aerial refueling and mission system testing. An F-16 was successfully refueled on 8 July, and a C-17 on 12 July 2016. Once the hardware fix is verified, a KC-46 with the updated boom underwent regression testing on the F-16, followed by refueling demonstrations with the C-17 and A-10 for the final test for Milestone C approval. On 15 July 2016, the KC-46 successfully refueled an A-10, offloading 1,500 pounds of fuel at 15,000 feet. At the time, more than 900 flight test hours have been completed by the five EMD aircraft. On 12 August 2016, the program received Milestone C approval, indicating production readiness; the issuing of contracts for two lots covering 19 aircraft was expected within 30 days.

In January 2018, Air Mobility Command stated that tests for final FAA certification were roughly 94 percent complete. Boeing announced its FAA certification on 4 September 2018, with military certification outstanding. Aircraft refueled during testing include the F-16, F/A-18, AV-8B, C-17, A-10, KC-10, KC-135 and the KC-46 itself. On 22 January 2019, a KC-46 from the 418th Flight Test Squadron at Edwards AFB made connection with an F-35A, the occasion being the first time that the KC-46 connected with a fifth-generation jet fighter. Completion of refueling certification of the F-35 by the KC-46 was announced by the 412th Test Wing on 5 June 2019.

On 30 March 2020, the USAF announced that chronic leaks in the fuel system had been upgraded to a Category I deficiency. The USAF identified the issue in June 2019, but had not originally believed it to be serious. Crews became aware of the issue when they discovered fuel between the primary and secondary fuel protection barriers; there was no known root cause at the time of the announcement. By January 2021, Boeing's losses on the program were estimated at $5 billion. At the time, it was expected that the KC-46 would not be combat ready until at least late 2023.

Design

The KC-46 Pegasus is a variant of the Boeing 767 and is a widebody, low-wing cantilever monoplane with a conventional empennage featuring a single fin and rudder. It has a retractable tricycle landing gear and a hydraulic flight control system. The Pegasus is powered by two Pratt & Whitney PW4062 engines, one mounted under each wing. It has been described as combining "the 767-200ER's fuselage, with the 767-300F's wing, gear, cargo door and floor, with the 767-400ER digital flightdeck and flaps". The KC-46 uses a similar Maneuvering Characteristics Augmentation System (MCAS) to that implicated in two 737 MAX crashes; in March 2019, the USAF began reviewing KC-46 training due to this feature. Unlike the 737, the KC-46's MCAS takes input from dual redundant angle of attack sensors and disengages with stick input by the pilot.

The flightdeck has room for a crew of four with a forward crew compartment with seats for 15 crew members and in the rear fuselage either palletized passenger seating for 58, or 18 pallets in cargo configuration. The rear compartment can also be used in an aero-medical configuration for 54 patients (24 on litters). Survivability is improved with infrared countermeasures and the aircraft has limited electronic warfare capabilities. It uses manual flight controls, allowing unrestricted maneuverability to avoid threats anywhere in the flight envelope.

At the rear of the aircraft is a fly-by-wire refueling boom supplemented by wing air refueling pods at each wingtip and a centerline drogue system under the rear fuselage so it can handle both types of refueling in one mission.

Rather than using a single boom operator seated or prone at the tail looking out a window, the Aerial Refueling Operator Station (AROS) seats two operators at a video station at the front of the aircraft. They view images from a series of multi-spectral cameras distributed around the aircraft. AROS includes three main displays in front of each operator. The central 2D/3D display provides a view out the back of the aircraft for boom refueling operations. Boom operators can execute their mission in total darkness, with both aircraft blacked out. The hybrid 2D-3D system requires the use of stereoscopic glasses to get the full effect. The Remote Vision System (RVS) that feeds video to the AROS has been a source of problems including motion viewed in the RVS versus which can create a depth compression and curvature effect.
 Blackouts and washouts on the video displays during refueling, caused by shadows or direct sunlight are a problem that will be fixed by the RVS 2.0 upgrade. RVS 2.0 is expected to alleviate problems in depth perception with new cameras and a full-color, high-definition screen. Boom operators with hundreds of hours of experience on older refuelers still prefer the KC-46, even with its current drawbacks.

The boom is furnished with a hydraulic relief valve system, similar to those on the KC-10 and KC-767 tankers, to relieve axial pressure in the event of excessive loads building up on the boom. In order to address the stiff boom issue, which keeps a KC-46 from refueling lightweight, thrust-limited receivers like the A-10, Boeing is replacing the current actuator with one using a pressure-flow PQ valve in the 2023 time frame. Near the front landing gear, there is a ladder that can be pulled down, providing quick ingress by the crew to the aircraft.

Operational history

United States

On 23 April 2014, the USAF announced that the KC-46 will be based at McConnell Air Force Base in Wichita, Kansas, with an optimistic expectation of receiving the first of 36 tankers in 2016. McConnell AFB was chosen because it had low construction costs and it is in a location with a high demand for air refueling, having KC-135 Stratotankers based there. In addition to McConnell AFB serving as the home base, up to 10 operating bases will be used by the KC-46. Crews will be trained at Altus Air Force Base, Oklahoma, which was also chosen for its limited construction needs and for its existing experience with training programs for the C-17 Globemaster and the KC-135.

On 29 October 2015, the USAF announced that Seymour Johnson Air Force Base, North Carolina, was chosen as the preferred alternative for the first Reserve-led KC-46A main operating base, with an anticipated arrival of the KC-46As at Seymour Johnson in fiscal year 2019. Tinker Air Force Base, Oklahoma; Westover Air Reserve Base, Massachusetts; and Grissom Air Reserve Base, Indiana, were named as the reasonable alternatives. The October 2015 announcement also stated that the USAF intended to initiate an Environmental Impact Analysis Process (EIAP), which the USAF would use to make its final basing decisions.

On 10 January 2019, the USAF took delivery of the first KC-46, well past the original 2016 delivery date, albeit with two issues outstanding and funds withheld. The two outstanding issues were inadequate boom pressure when refueling the A-10 Warthog and glare induced distortion under certain conditions in the remote vision system (RVS). The USAF acknowledged that they failed to give Boeing adequate specifications for the A-10. At milestone C, Boeing gave the USAF a boom design that used the international standard of 1400 lbs of thrust resistance, which they accepted, but A-10 is only able to generate 650 lbs.

On 25 January 2019, the 22d Air Refueling Wing at McConnell AFB received its first two KC-46As (15-46009 and 17-46031). On 3 February 2019, the 97th Air Mobility Wing at Altus AFB received its first KC-46.

On 2 April 2019, it was confirmed that the USAF halted all deliveries on 23 March and until further notification, as loose material and debris were found in planes already delivered.

On 8 August 2019, the 157th Air Refueling Wing at Pease Air National Guard Base received its first KC-46A.

On 12 September 2019, the USAF restricted the KC-46 from carrying cargo and passengers due to an issue with the floor cargo locks unlocking mid-flight. A fix was approved by the USAF on 12 November 2019 and were retrofitted upon delivered aircraft. By 20 December 2019, four KC-46As had received new cargo locks and the USAF had closed the Category 1 deficiency and cleared retrofitted aircraft for cargo and passenger operations.

On 12 June 2020, the 916th Air Refueling Wing at Seymour Johnson Air Force Base received its first KC-46A. By January 2021, Boeing had delivered 42 KC-46As to the USAF and was on contract for 94 tankers.

In early 2021, the USAF cleared the KC-46 for limited operational use, years after its planned 2017 introduction. The type can conduct U.S.-based refueling only, requiring other tankers for deployments to combat areas. At the time, the KC-46 could refuel the B-52, F-15, F-16, and F/A-18, but it was not approved to service the A-10, F-22, F-35, B-1, or B-2; it is expected to be fully combat-ready by 2023.

As of 14 September 2022, the USAF approved the KC-46 for general operational use, closing out a 15-month evaluation period.

Export bids

India
In January 2018, the Indian Air Force re-launched its air-to-air refueling procurement program, and sent out a request for information for six refueling aircraft to Airbus, Boeing, and Ilyushin, to which Boeing could respond with an offer for the KC-46 Pegasus. Airbus and Boeing responded to the request for information, while Ilyushin was disqualified as the official requirement is for an aircraft with two turbofan engines.

On 6 April 2022, Hindustan Aeronautics Limited (HAL) announced that it had entered into an MoU with Israel Aerospace Industries (IAI) to convert passenger aircraft into multi-mission tanker transport (MMTT) aircraft in India.

Indonesia
In January 2018, Indonesian Air Force officials were reported as saying they were studying both the Airbus A330 MRTT and Boeing KC-46 Pegasus aerial refueling aircraft for a future modernization program, expected to take place after the current Airbus A400M Atlas program completes. The Indonesian Air Force is said to compare the aircraft on compatibility with the force's current aircraft, life-cycle costs, interoperability with current and future assets, and potential funding and technology transfer options with state-owned aircraft manufacturer Indonesian Aerospace.

Japan 
The Japan Air Self-Defense Force (JASDF) operates four of the earlier Boeing KC-767 tankers that were delivered from 2008 to 2010. On 23 October 2015, Japan selected the KC-46, with a contract for three tankers expected in 2016. The decision allows for common operations and training with the USAF, and Japan was reportedly attracted to its capability to refuel MV-22 Osprey tiltrotors, which the JASDF is to receive. Airbus declined to bid its A330 MRTT, because they viewed Japan's request for proposals as intended for the KC-46. The three tankers are to be fielded around 2020 at a cost of more than ¥20.8 billion, about US$173 million per aircraft. An order for a third and fourth KC-46 was placed on 30 October 2020. Japan has ordered two additional KC-46 tankers in December 2022 for the Japan Air Self-Defense Force (JASDF), bringing Japan's order total to six.

On 8 February 2021, the JASDF conducted its first KC-46 flight. Training of Japanese KC-46 pilots began in June 2021 and Japan received its first KC-46 in November 2021.

Israel
On 3 March 2020, the State Department approved the Foreign Military Sale to Israel of eight KC-46s and related equipment for a cost of $2.4 billion.

On 1 September 2022, Boeing announced Israel has purchased four KC-46A aircraft from the company  to be delivered in 2025.

Others
On 3 November 2022, it was reported that Italy is negotiating the purchase of six KC-46s after deciding to forgo modernization work on the current fleet of four KC-767As. The purchase could also include logistics support for the KC-46A fleet for a period of five years. Total cost of the contract could be approximately €1.12 billion. Italy's four KC-767As would be sold to Boeing.

Failed bids

Canada
On 2 February 2017, Boeing stated it would bid the KC-46A for the Royal Canadian Air Force's Strategic Tanker Transport Capability competition, which is to replace Canada's fleet of CC-150 Polaris tankers. The contract is valued at C$1.5+ billion. However, on 1 April 2021, Airbus Defence and Space and their submission of the A330 MRTT was deemed to be the only qualified bidder to replace the CC-150.

Korea
In June 2014, Boeing submitted the KC-46 for the Republic of Korea Air Force's requirement for four aerial tankers. The KC-46 competed with the Airbus A330 MRTT; South Korea selected the Airbus A330 MRTT in June 2015.

Poland
Boeing pitched the KC-46 to the Polish Air Force for its tanker requirement. In December 2014, Airbus was awarded a contract for four A330 MRTTs from a consortium of Poland, the Netherlands, and Norway.

United Arab Emirates
In May 2019, according to Boeing, the United Arab Emirates made a formal request to procure three KC-46As. In November 2021 the United Arab Emirates ordered two more Airbus A330 MRTTs for a total of five.

Operators

Israeli Air Force - 4 aircraft on order, out of 8 planned

Japan Air Self-Defense Force - 2nd of 4 aircraft on order delivered as of 24 February 2022

United States Air Force - 61 aircraft delivered
Air Force Material Command
412th Test Wing (AFMC) - Edwards AFB, California (2 on loan from McConnell AFB)
418th Flight Test Squadron
Air Education and Training Command
97th Air Mobility Wing (AETC) – Altus AFB, Oklahoma (aircrew training), full complement of 8 delivered as of 6 October 2021
56th Air Refueling Squadron
Air Mobility Command
6th Air Mobility Wing (AMC)
911th Air Refueling Squadron – Seymour Johnson AFB, North Carolina (Active Duty Associate to the 916 ARW)
22d Air Refueling Wing (AMC) – McConnell AFB, Kansas, 22 delivered as of 20 May 2022
344th Air Refueling Squadron
305th Air Mobility Wing (AMC) - Joint Base McGuire–Dix–Lakehurst, 8 of 24 delivered as of 17 June 2022
2d Air Refueling Squadron
Air Force Reserve Command
916th Air Refueling Wing (AFRC) – Seymour Johnson AFB, North Carolina, 11 delivered as of 3 June 2022
77th Air Refueling Squadron
514th Air Mobility Wing (AFRC) - Joint Base McGuire–Dix–Lakehurst
78th Air Refueling Squadron
Air National Guard
157th Air Refueling Wing (ANG) – Pease ANGB, New Hampshire, full complement of 12 delivered as of 5 February 2021
133d Air Refueling Squadron

Specifications

See also

References

External links 

 
 Boeing.com Feature story on KC-46A contract award
 

KC-46
Twinjets
Air refueling
Boeing 767
Low-wing aircraft
Aircraft first flown in 2015